Brons, named after Jan Brons, was a Dutch engine manufacturer in Appingedam that existed from 1907 to 2004. The company made more than 4000 engines for large machines such as ships, tractors, and busses. The company is notable for its early stationary industrial motors and ship engines, but also for an early 1899 prototype light omnibus called "The Brons".

History
Jan Brons (January 20, 1865 – February 9, 1954) first developed an autobus with a motor that ran on petroleum in 1890, but because he wanted it to run on petrol he then created the omnibus in 1899. It was for this omnibus that he later bought a patent (in Germany, because it was not possible to get a patent for it in the Netherlands). The bus was in service for some years until it broke a wheel. It was never in production. When Rudolf Diesel developed the diesel motor in the 1890s, Brons found it to be too complicated and invented a type of "spray cup" he called the "verstuiverbak" or "bakjesknapper" to simplify the fuel injection process. This method was later bought by HVID, that later patented their method.

In the 1930s the company tried to make a comeback with truck engines, full trucks have never been made, though a couple of Brons-tractors were built and sold.

The company that made the car was known as the Appingedammer Bronsmotorenfabriek continued to manufacture heavy diesel engines for ships, electrical generators and pumps, later being taken over by US company Waukesha Engines. The archives of the company remain with a society devoted to preserving this industrial heritage.

Patents
 US Patent 644814 Rotary Engine, Jan Brons, dated July 31, 1899
 US Patent 868839 Hydrocarbon Engine, Jan Brons & Nanno Timmer, dated October 7, 1907
 US Patent 1759776 Multicylinder Combustion Motor, Jan Brons & Naamloze Vennoot (nameless partner), dated January 7, 1927

References

General
 David Burgess Wise, The New Illustrated Encyclopedia of Automobiles.
 Society for the preservation of the Brons motor industrial heritage
 Patent Brons - 100 jaar verstuiverbak motoren (100 Years of Spray Cup Engines), J. Vegter, 2002, 

Defunct bus manufacturers
Engine manufacturers of the Netherlands
Companies based in Groningen (province)
Two-stroke diesel engines
Bus manufacturers of the Netherlands
Dutch companies established in 1907
Vehicle manufacturing companies established in 1907
Eemsdelta